Jay Miller may refer to:

Jay Miller (anthropologist), specializing in Native American groups
Jay Miller (basketball) (1943–2001), former National Basketball League player
Jay Miller (ice hockey) (born 1960), former National Hockey League player
J. D. "Jay" Miller (1922–1996), American record producer, musician and songwriter
Jay Miller (softball), American softball coach
Jay Miller (American football) (born 1954), American football player

See also
Miller (name)